James Robinson (born August 9, 1998) is an American football running back for the New England Patriots of the National Football League (NFL). He played college football at Illinois State and signed with the Jaguars as an undrafted free agent in 2020, and was traded to the Jets in 2022. In 2020, Robinson broke the NFL record for most scrimmage yards of any undrafted rookie.

Early life and high school
Robinson was born and grew up in Rockford, Illinois. He attended Rockford Lutheran High School, where he played basketball and football. As a senior, he rushed 2,461 yards and 44 touchdowns and was named Class 4A All-State. Robinson set IHSA career records with 9,045 rushing yards and 158 rushing touchdowns.

College career
Robinson played in nine games as a true freshman in 2016, missing three games due to a calf injury and finishing the season as the Redbirds third-leading rusher with 322 yards and two touchdowns on 63 carries. He became the team's starting running back as a sophomore and was named first-team All-Missouri Valley Football Conference (MVFC) after rushing for 933 yards and 12 touchdowns. Robinson rushed for 1,290 yards and 12 touchdowns in his junior season and was again named first-team All-MVFC as well as a first-team All-American by Phil Steele, a second-team All-American by STATS and HERO Sports and to the Associated Press's third-team and was a finalist for the Walter Payton Award. As a senior, he rushed for 1,899 yards and 18 touchdowns and was a consensus first-team FCS All-American and a first-team All-Conference selection for the third straight season. Robinson finished his collegiate career with 4,444 rushing yards, second most in school history.

Professional career

Jacksonville Jaguars
Robinson signed with the Jacksonville Jaguars as an undrafted free agent on April 27, 2020, shortly after the conclusion of the 2020 NFL Draft. Robinson made the Jaguars' 53-man regular season roster out of training camp and was announced as the team's starting running back several days later.

Robinson made his NFL debut in Week 1 of the 2020 season against the Indianapolis Colts. He recorded 16 carries for 62 rushing yards and a reception in which he leapt over Colts safety Khari Willis for 28 receiving yards in the 27–20 victory. Robinson became the fourth undrafted rookie running back to start week one since 1970, and set the record for most rushing yards for an undrafted rookie in Week 1. He became the first running back from Illinois State to start a game since Aveion Cason in 2006.  A week later, on September 20, 2020, Robinson tallied 120 all-purpose yards and scored his first career touchdown in a 33–30 loss to the Tennessee Titans. In Week 3, against the Miami Dolphins on Thursday Night Football, he had 129 scrimmage yards and two rushing touchdowns in the 31–13 loss. 
On October 1, 2020, Robinson was named the NFL Offensive Rookie of the Month for his performance in September. In Week 7 against the Los Angeles Chargers, he had 22 carries for 119 rushing yards and one rushing touchdown to go along with four receptions for 18 receiving yards and one receiving touchdown in the 39–29 loss. In Week 10, against the Green Bay Packers, he had 23 carries for 109 rushing yards in the 24–20 loss. In Week 12, against the Cleveland Browns, he had 22 carries for 128 rushing yards and one rushing touchdown to go along with five receptions for 31 receiving yards in the 27–25 loss.

Robinson is the fourth undrafted player in NFL history to rush for 1,000 yards in his rookie season, following Dominic Rhodes, LeGarrette Blount, and Phillip Lindsay. He also finished with the record for most scrimmage yards of any rookie free agent in NFL history. Robinson was  ranked 100th on the NFL Top 100 Players of 2021 list.

Against the New York Jets in Week 16 of the 2021 season, Robinson tore his achilles in the first quarter, ending his season. He finished the season with 767 rushing yards and eight touchdowns through 14 games.

New York Jets
On October 25, 2022, Robinson was traded to the New York Jets in exchange for a conditional sixth-round pick following an ACL injury to Breece Hall that cut his 2022 season short. Despite the change of scenery, Robinson only played in four games the rest of the season for the Jets. On the 2022 season, Robinson had 110 carries for 425 rushing yards and three rushing touchdowns to go along with 11 receptions for 51 receiving yards and two receiving touchdowns.

New England Patriots
On March 17, 2023, Robinson signed a two-year, $8 million contract with the New England Patriots.

NFL career statistics

References

External links
Illinois State Redbirds bio
Jacksonville Jaguars bio

1998 births
Living people
Players of American football from Illinois
Sportspeople from Rockford, Illinois
American football running backs
Illinois State Redbirds football players
Jacksonville Jaguars players
New England Patriots players
New York Jets players